Eun-soo, also spelled Eun-su, or Un-soo, is a Korean unisex given name.  Its meaning depends on the hanja used to write each syllable of the name. There are 26 hanja with the reading "eun" and 67 hanja with the reading "soo" on the South Korean government's official list of hanja which may be used in given names.

People with this name include:
Oh Eun-su (born 1993), South Korean male curler
Seo Eun-soo (born Lee Jeong-min, 1994), South Korean actress
Shin Eun-soo (born 2002), South Korean actress who debuted in the 2016 film Vanishing Time: A Boy Who Returned
Lim Eun-soo (born 2003), South Korean female figure skater
Yoon Eun-su, South Korean female figure skater, junior silver medalist for the 2014 Lombardia Trophy

Fictional characters with this name include:
Eun-su, in 1993 South Korean film Kid Cop
Eun-soo, in 2002 South Korean film Addicted
Han Eun-soo, in 2007 South Korean television series Que Sera, Sera
Ji Eun-soo, in 2004 South Korean television series Save the Last Dance for Me
Lee Eun-soo, in 2007 South Korean film Hansel and Gretel
Yoo Eun-soo, in 2012 South Korean television series Faith
Lee Eun-soo, in 2013 South Korean television series Your Lady

See also
List of Korean given names

References

Korean unisex given names